The Vovcha is a river in Dnipropetrovsk and Donetsk Oblasts, Ukraine. The river flows for 323 kilometres, covering a basin area of 13,300 km2. It runs through the city of Pavlohrad. It flows into the Samara near the village of Raduta.

References

Rivers of Dnipropetrovsk Oblast
Rivers of Donetsk Oblast
Rivers of Zaporizhzhia Oblast